Staying a Life is a double live album by Accept, released in 1990. It was recorded in Osaka, Japan, in 1985. It was released in 1990, shortly after the band's first breakup. It was mixed by Uli Baronowsky at Dierks Studios, Stommeln. Live footage from the 1985–1986 world tour was released in VHS also in 1990, with the same title and cover art. "Neon Nights", "Burning", "Head Over Heels", and "Outro (Bound to Fail)" are omitted from the single disc edition.

Track listings
Music and words by Accept & Deaffy

European edition

US edition

VHS track listing

Credits
Band members
Udo Dirkschneider – vocals
Wolf Hoffmann – guitars
Jörg Fischer – guitars
Peter Baltes – bass guitar
Stefan Kaufmann – drums, producer

References

Accept (band) albums
1990 live albums
RCA Records live albums
Epic Records live albums
Live video albums
PolyGram video albums
Albums recorded at Festival Hall, Osaka